HMS Fearless was an F-class destroyer built for the Royal Navy during the 1930s. Although assigned to the Home Fleet upon completion, the ship was attached to the Mediterranean Fleet in 1935–36 during the Abyssinia Crisis. During the Spanish Civil War of 1936–1939, she spent time in Spanish waters, enforcing the arms blockade imposed by Britain and France on both sides of the conflict. Several months after the start of the war in September 1939, Fearless helped to sink one submarine and sank another one in 1940 during the Norwegian Campaign. She was sent to Gibraltar in mid-1940 and formed part of Force H where she participated in the attack on the Vichy French ships at Mers-el-Kébir and the bombardment of Genoa. Fearless helped to sink one final submarine in 1941 and escorted many Malta convoys in the Mediterranean before she was torpedoed by an Italian bomber and had to be scuttled on 23 July 1941.

Description
The F-class ships were repeats of the preceding E-class. They were powered by two Parsons geared steam turbines, each driving one propeller shaft, using steam provided by three Admiralty three-drum boilers. The ships' complement was 145 officers and ratings.

The ships mounted four 4.7-inch (120 mm) Mark IX guns in single mounts, designated 'A', 'B', 'X', and 'Y' in sequence from front to rear. For anti-aircraft (AA) defence, they had two quadruple Mark I mounts for the 0.5 inch Vickers Mark III machine gun. The F class was fitted with two above-water quadruple torpedo tube mounts for  torpedoes. One depth charge rack and two throwers were fitted; 20 depth charges were originally carried, but this increased to 38 shortly after the war began. All of her sister ships had their rear torpedo tubes replaced by a 12-pounder AA gun by April 1941, but she still had both sets of torpedo tube by that date and was probably not rearmed before her loss a few months later.

Construction and career
Fearless was ordered on 17 March 1933 from Cammell Laird and was laid down at their Birkenhead shipyard on 17 July, launched on 12 May 1934, and completed on 19 December 1934. The ship cost 245,728 pounds, excluding government-furnished equipment like the armament. Fearless was initially assigned to the 6th Destroyer Flotilla (DF) of the Home Fleet, but she was detached to reinforce the Mediterranean Fleet during the Second Italo-Abyssinian War from March to July 1936. The ship enforced the arms embargo imposed on both sides in the Spanish Civil War by the Non-Intervention Committee from November 1936 to March 1937. During this time, Fearless escorted the elderly liner , full of refugee children, from the Basque Country to Saint-Jean-de-Luz, France. She returned to Gibraltar for three-month detachments in August 1937, January 1938 and January 1939. The 6th DF was renumbered the 8th Destroyer Flotilla in April 1939, five months before the outbreak of World War II. Fearless remained assigned to it until May 1940, escorting the larger ships of the fleet.

After a pair of fishing trawlers were sunk by a submarine off the Hebrides after the start of World War II in September 1939, the 6th and 8th DFs were ordered to sweep the area on 19 September. At the end of March 1940, Fearless and the destroyer  were assigned to screen the light cruiser  as she searched for German fishing ships off the Norwegian coast. Birmingham and her consorts were ordered to join the covering force for Operation Wilfred, an operation to lay mines in the Vestfjord to prevent the transport of Swedish iron ore from Narvik to Germany, on the evening of 7 April, but they were delayed by the need to transfer prize crews to several captured trawlers and head seas.

A week later, she was escorting the battleship  which was covering Convoy NP1, the first troop convoy to Norway, as the Allies began to execute Plan R 4 after the German invasion on 9 April. The convoy entered the Andfjorden on the morning of 15 April en route to make their landings at Harstad, but paused there after reports of a German submarine on the surface inside the Vågsfjorden were received. Fearless, the destroyer , and the trawler  were ordered into the Vågsfjorden to investigate. Fearlesss ASDIC found a submarine and the ship dropped five depth charges near . The submarine commander, Lieutenant (Kapitänleutnant) Curt von Gossler, panicked and ordered his crew to surface and scuttle the boat. Machinegun fire from Fearless discouraged von Gossler from properly disposing of his secret documents and a boat from Brazen was able to retrieve many of them, including a map showing the location of all U-boats in Norwegian waters. Valiant, Fearless, Brazen and the destroyer  were ordered to return to Scapa Flow that evening.

Fearless was detached to refuel at Sullom Voe on the 28th and rejoined the screen two days later. The ship was under repair from 15 May to 10 June at Middlesbrough.

Force H, 1940–41
On 3 July she took part in the attack on the French Fleet at Mers-el-Kébir (Operation Catapult). A month later the ship escorted Force H during Operation Hurry, a mission to fly off fighter aircraft for Malta and conduct an airstrike on Cagliari on 2 August. Two days later, while returning to the UK, Fearless collided with the trawler Flying Wing and was repaired at the Barclay Curle shipyard in Scotstoun between 10 August and 11 October. More repairs followed at Troon, and Fearless did not rejoin Force H at Gibraltar until 18 January 1941.

On 31 January, Force H departed Gibraltar to carry out Operation Picket, an unsuccessful night torpedo attack by eight of Ark Royals Fairey Swordfish on the Tirso Dam in Sardinia. The British ships returned to Gibraltar on 4 February and began preparing for Operation Grog, a naval bombardment of Genoa, that was successfully carried out five days later. Fearless was ordered to board and capture Bangkok, but she was thwarted by gunfire from a coast-defence battery off the port of Nemours, Algeria. A few days later, Fearless and four other destroyers escorted Sheffield, the battlecruiser , and Ark Royal in Operation Winch, which delivered 12 Hurricane fighters to Malta.

This was part of Operation Tiger which included a supply convoy taking tanks to the Middle East and the transfer of warships. Fearless and her sisters had their Two-Speed Destroyer Sweep (TSDS) minesweeping gear rigged to allow them to serve as a fast minesweepers en route to Malta. Despite this, one merchant ship was sunk by mines and another damaged. The ship escorted another flying-off mission to Malta on 14 June; two days later, after German blockade runners reached France, Force H sortied into the Atlantic on a failed search for more blockade runners. Together with her sisters Faulknor,  and Foxhound, Fearless helped to sink  on 18 June. Four days later, the 8th DF was tasked to intercept a German supply ship spotted heading towards the French coast. The next day they intercepted  which was scuttled by her crew upon the approach of the British ships. They rescued 78 British POWs taken from ships sunk by German raiders as well as the crew.

Another Malta convoy (Operation Substance) was conducted in mid-July, heavily escorted by Force H and elements of the Home Fleet. Fearless was torpedoed by an Italian Savoia-Marchetti SM.79 bomber at 09:45 on 23 July. The detonation killed 27 and wounded 11 of her crew, set the aft oil tank on fire, and knocked out all power and the port propeller shaft. Forester closed to render assistance, but Fearless could not be saved under the circumstances.

Notes

References

External links
 HMS Fearless on naval-history.net
 IWM Interview with survivor Robert Craddock

 

E and F-class destroyers of the Royal Navy
Ships built on the River Mersey
1934 ships
World War II destroyers of the United Kingdom
Destroyers sunk by aircraft
World War II shipwrecks in the Mediterranean Sea
Maritime incidents in July 1941
Ships sunk by Italian aircraft
Scuttled vessels